A. J. Raebel (born April 11, 1985) is a former professional Canadian football defensive end. He was signed by the Minnesota Vikings as an undrafted free agent in 2009. He played college football for the UW–Whitewater Warhawks. He now coaches high school football at Waukesha South High School in Waukesha, WI.
 
Raebel was also a member of the Saskatchewan Roughriders.

External links
Saskatchewan Roughriders bio

1985 births
Living people
People from Cary, Illinois
American players of Canadian football
Canadian football defensive linemen
American football defensive ends
Wisconsin–Whitewater Warhawks football players
Minnesota Vikings players
Saskatchewan Roughriders players